Collonia admissa is a species of small sea snail with calcareous opercula, a marine gastropod mollusk in the family Colloniidae.

Description
The shell grows to a height of 2.5 mm.

Distribution
This species occurs in the Atlantic Ocean off St Helena.

References

 Smith E. A. (1890) Report on the marine molluscan fauna of the island of St. Helena. Proceedings of the Zoological Society of London (1890): 247-317, pl 21-24. [August 1890]
page(s): 294, pl. 22 fig. 4

External links
 To Encyclopedia of Life
 To World Register of Marine Species

Colloniidae
Gastropods described in 1890